Blossom Market Hall is a food hall located in the San Gabriel Mission District of San Gabriel, California, on Mission Drive. Blossom Market Hall opened in December 2021 by Nellie and Chris Tran. The food hall occupies a historic former Masonic lodge, which was built in 1949, and houses thirteen food stalls that offer a diverse array of cuisines. The food hall's name acknowledges purple jacaranda trees grown in the San Gabriel Valley.

Background
The food hall comprises  of retail space on the first floor, and an additional  of meeting and art gallery space on the second floor. The food hall's ceiling includes a mural of California wildflowers, which was designed by Nao Miyamoto.

See also 

 Food hall
 San Gabriel, California

References

External links 

 

Shopping malls in Los Angeles
Los Angeles
Food halls
2021 establishments in California
Food markets in the United States